Lobomonas is a genus of green algae in the family Chlamydomonadaceae.

References

External links

Chlamydomonadales genera
Chlamydomonadaceae